Kukerin is a small town in the Wheatbelt region of Western Australia,  south-east of Perth between Dumbleyung and Lake Grace just off  Dumbleyung Lake Grace Road on State Route 107. The town itself is small but services a considerable agricultural region in the eastern Shire of Dumbleyung. At the 2021 census, Kukerin and its surrounding areas had a population of 55.

History
According to an official source, Kukerin's name is of Aboriginal origin, was first recorded as the name of a local soak and gully in 1908 and has also been spelled "Cookerin", but the precise meaning is not known. However, in local languages, words such as karkar mean "east", and the townsite is near the eastern edge of country traditionally owned by the Wiilman people. There is no evidence for a popular theory that the area was named after sandalwood cutters named "Cooke" and "Ring".

Until 1912, the area was known as Merilup (a name that now refers to an area to the south). Sandalwood cutters opened up much of the surrounding area, and in 1904 the Rabbit-Proof Fence was built near the town.

In 1912, the town was gazetted when it became the terminus of an extension of the Wagin to Dumbleyung train line in 1912. The primary school and hall were built in 1914, and Kukerin Hotel began trading in 1928—all are still open to this day.

Present day
Kukerin is largely an agricultural town, with wheat and sheep farming being the main occupations.
It functions as a service town for the surrounding agricultural area, and contains a general store, primary school, hotel, newsagency/post office, and the Nenke Park sports fields. The TrachMach Fair used to be held with various vintage and modern vehicles on display. In recent years this has transformed into the Kukerin Creekbed and Burnout Competition, which is held during the Queen's Birthday long weekend and is hosted at Nenke Park.  During this event a large screen is set up where the AFL Grand Final can be viewed.

References

External links
 History of Kukerin
 Shire of Dumbleyung
 Kukerin creek bed races

Towns in Western Australia
Wheatbelt (Western Australia)